OGG or ogg may refer to:

Ogg (surname)
Ogg, Texas
Nanny Ogg, a character in the Discworld series of books
Ogg, a multimedia container file format, in computing
Ogg Vorbis, the Vorbis free software/open source audio codec, commonly used with the Ogg container
Kahului Airport's IATA code
Ogg (Cro character), in the Children's Television Workshop animated television show
Ogging, an online computer gaming tactic popularized by the network game Netrek
Oud Gereformeerde Gemeenten, a pietistic Reformed denomination in the Netherlands
Operation Good Guys (OGG), a British TV mockumentary series
Original Gospel Gangstaz, Christian hip hop group
Oxford Geology Group, a British geological society
 Oxoguanine glycosylase, a DNA glycosylase enzyme

See also
Oggy (disambiguation)